Alfred Booth (24 February 1893 – 19 December 1965) was a British Congregational lay preacher and politician.

Booth served with the Lancashire Fusiliers during World War I.  In 1933, he was elected to Bolton Borough Council, and he was Mayor of Bolton in 1941–42.  He was also vice-president of the Cremation Society, and chair of the Bolton National Savings Committee.

Booth was elected as the Labour Member of Parliament (MP) for  Bolton East in 1950, but lost the seat in 1951, and failed to retake it in 1955.

References

External links 
 

1893 births
1965 deaths
People from Bolton
Mayors of Bolton
UK MPs 1950–1951
Labour Party (UK) MPs for English constituencies
Labour Party (UK) mayors
English Congregationalist ministers
20th-century Congregationalist ministers